Sir James Horner Haslett (January 1832 – 18 August 1905) was an Irish Conservative Party and then Unionist Party politician who sat in the House of Commons of the United Kingdom from 1885 to 1886 and 1896 to 1905.

Haslett was born in Knock, Belfast, the son of the Rev. Henry Haslett of Castlereagh, County Down and his wife Mary Wilson daughter of  John Wilson, linen merchant of Drumcroon, Coleraine. He was educated at Academical Institute Belfast and became a chemist and druggist. He was an alderman, and a Justice of the Peace (J.P.) of Belfast.

At the 1885 general election Haslett was elected Member of Parliament for Belfast West. He held the seat until 1886. He was Mayor of Belfast in 1887 and knighted in the same year. He was mayor again in 1888.

He returned to the House of Commons at a by-election in January 1896 as MP for Belfast North. He was re-elected in 1900, and held the seat until his death in 1905 in Belfast, aged 73.

Haslett married Annie Rea of London in 1877.

References

External links

1832 births
1905 deaths
Irish Conservative Party MPs
Knights Bachelor
Members of the Parliament of the United Kingdom for Belfast constituencies (1801–1922)
UK MPs 1885–1886
UK MPs 1895–1900
UK MPs 1900–1906
Date of birth missing
Mayors of Belfast
Irish Unionist Party MPs